Bark Ranch is an unincorporated community and a census-designated place (CDP) located in and governed by Boulder County, Colorado, United States. The Bark Ranch CDP encompasses the Bar-K Ranch housing community. The CDP is a part of the Boulder, CO Metropolitan Statistical Area. The population of the Bark Ranch CDP was 213 at the United States Census 2010. The Ward post office (Zip Code 80481) serves the area.

Geography
Bar-K Ranch is located in west central Boulder County in the Front Range of the Colorado Rocky Mountains. It is situated on a ridge west of Jamestown and south of South St. Vrain Creek. Overland Road forms the northern edge of the community, leading east to Jamestown and Altona and west to State Highway 72, the Peak to Peak Highway.

Demographics

See also

Outline of Colorado
Index of Colorado-related articles
State of Colorado
Colorado cities and towns
Colorado census designated places
Colorado counties
Boulder County, Colorado
Colorado metropolitan areas
Front Range Urban Corridor
North Central Colorado Urban Area
Denver-Aurora-Boulder, CO Combined Statistical Area
Boulder, CO Metropolitan Statistical Area

References

External links

Bar-K Association
Bar-K Ranch community page
Boulder County website

Census-designated places in Boulder County, Colorado
Census-designated places in Colorado
Denver metropolitan area